"Captive Nations" is a term that arose in the United States to describe nations under undemocratic regimes. During the Cold War, when the phrase appeared, it referred to nations under Communist administration, primarily Soviet rule.

As a part of the United States' Cold War strategy, an anti-Communist advocacy group, the National Captive Nations Committee, was established in 1959 according to an act of Congress by President Dwight D. Eisenhower. The American economist and diplomat of Ukrainian heritage Lev Dobriansky played a key role in it. The US branch of the Anti-Bolshevik Bloc of Nations also lobbied in favor of the bill.

The law also established Captive Nations Week, traditionally proclaimed for the third week in July since then. The move aimed at raising public awareness of the problems of nations under the control of Communist and other non-democratic governments.

The original Public Law 86-90 specifically referred to the following Captive Nations:

 Poland
 Hungary
 Lithuania
 Ukraine
 Czechoslovakia
 Latvia
 Estonia
 White Ruthenia (Belarus)
 Romania
 East Germany
 Bulgaria
 Mainland China
 Armenia
 Azerbaijan
 Georgia
 North Korea
 Albania
 Idel-Ural
 Tibet
 Cossackia
 Turkestan
 North Vietnam

Criticism 
Russian émigrés living in US, criticized P.L. 86-90, because in speaking of "Russian communism" and "imperialistic policies of Communist Russia" this law by implication equated the terms "Russian", "Communist" and "Imperialist". Specifically, the Congress of Russian Americans argued that P.L. 86-90 was anti-Russian rather than anti-Communist since the list of "captive nations" did not include Russians, thus implying that the blame for the Communist crimes lies on the Russians as a nation, rather than just on the Soviet system. According to the Russian writer Andrei Tsygankov, the suggested reason for this is that the law was designed by Lev Dobriansky viewed by the Russian Americans as a Ukrainian nationalist. Members of Congress have campaigned for nullification of the Captive Nations law.

A group of American historians issued a statement claiming that PL 86-90 was largely based on misinformation and committed the United States to aiding ephemeral "nations" such as Cossackia and Idel-Ural.

Gregory P. Tschebotarioff, Stephen Timoshenko, Nicholas V. Riasanovsky, Gleb Struve, Nicholas Timasheff were among opponents of PL 86-90.

In a 1959 news conference, the US president Dwight D. Eisenhower stated "Well, of course they don't admit there are any captive nations. They have their own propaganda. They present a picture to their own peoples, including the world, so far as they can, that we know is distorted and is untrue."

Current vision
American leaders continue the tradition of celebrating Captive Nations Week and each year issue a new version of the Proclamation.  Contemporary Proclamations do not refer to particular nations or states. The latest US President to specify a list of countries with oppressive regimes was George W. Bush, whose 2008 Proclamation mentioned Belarus and North Korea (in 1959 Belarus was denoted as White Ruthenia). George W. Bush characterized the leaders of the two countries as 'despots'.

When declaring the July 2009 Captive Nations Week, President Barack Obama stated that while the Cold War was over, concerns raised by President Eisenhower remained valid.

See also
Eastern Bloc
Soviet Empire
Western betrayal
Military occupations by the Soviet Union
Russian-occupied territories
Brezhnev Doctrine

References 

Cold War
Anti-communism in the United States
Anti-Russian sentiment
Soviet Union–United States relations
Political terminology of the United States
Belarusian independence movement
Turn of the third millennium